An exorcist in some religions is a person who is believed to be able to cast out the devil or other demons.

Exorcist may also refer to:

Fiction
 The Exorcist (novel), a 1971 horror novel by William Peter Blatty
 The Exorcist (franchise), a number of releases in different media based on the fictional story from the novel
 The Exorcist, a 1973 film adapted from the novel
 The Exorcist (play), a 2012 play by John Pielmeier based on the novel
 The Exorcist (TV series), a 2016 television series based on the novel and film series
 The Exorcist: Italian Style, a 1975 Italian comedy film
 Echorsis, a 2016 Philippine dark comedy film

See also
 List of exorcists
 Exorcism (disambiguation)